The Third Ear is an Israeli record store that runs the Earsay record label.

Third Ear may also refer to:
Third Ear Band, a British band
The Third Ear or Guðlaugur Kristinn Óttarsson, Icelandic guitar player and engineer
The Third Ear, a book on language learning by Chris Lonsdale